Svedmyra metro station is on the Green line of the Stockholm metro, located in Stureby, Söderort. The station was inaugurated on 1 October 1930 as part of the stretch between Gullmarsplan and Stureby.

A southerly extension of the Blue line of the Stockholm metro is currently under construction and expected to be opened for the passengers in 2030. As part of this development, the Blue line will take over this station.

See also
 Svedmyra

References

External links
Images of Svedmyra station
Metro lines via Svedmyra 
Svedmyra station map 

Green line (Stockholm metro) stations
Railway stations opened in 1930